WKTT (97.5 FM, "Live 97.5") is a radio station licensed to serve Salisbury, Maryland, United States. The station, which began broadcasting in 1969, is currently owned by Rojo Broadcasting, LLC.

WKTT broadcasts an urban contemporary format.

After nearly 40 years of broadcasting as WICO-FM, the station was assigned the current WKTT call sign by the Federal Communications Commission on March 30, 2009.

History
WICO-FM, sign on on September 3, 1969. originally broadcast at 94.3 FM. WICO-FM moved up the dial to 97.5 FM in the late 1990s which cleared the way for WINX-FM to sign on the air at 94.3 FM in Cambridge, Maryland.

WKTT and sister station WICO were purchased effective May 12, 2016 from Delmarva Broadcasting Company by Robin Rothschild, at a purchase price of $300,000.

On March 1, 2017, WKTT changed their format from country to urban contemporary, branded as "Live 97.5" after it was sold to Rojo Broadcasting, LLC for $305,000.

References

External links

KTT
Urban contemporary radio stations in the United States
Radio stations established in 1969
1969 establishments in Maryland